A shock tube detonator is a non-electric explosive fuze or initiator in the form of small-diameter hollow plastic tubing used to transport an initiating signal to an explosive by means of a shock wave (also known as a percussive wave) traveling the length of the tube. Shock tube is used to convey a detonation signal to a detonator. Shock tube is a hollow extruded tube containing a thin layer of energetic material upon its inner diameter. Once it is initiated, the shock tube transfers a signal to a detonating output charge.

It was invented by Per Anders Persson of Nitro Nobel AB, patented, and sold by them under the registered trademark Nonel, containing a small quantity of high explosive, but safer and more reliable than detonating cord with the same quantity of explosive. Another early product contained an enclosed combusting, non-detonating fiber.

The most common product is 3 mm outer diameter and 1 mm inner diameter, with a tiny dusting of HMX/aluminum explosive powder on the tubing's inner surface, which detonates down the tube at a speed greater than  but does not burst the tube. Being non-electrical and non-metallic, shock tubes are less sensitive to static electricity and radio frequency energy and thus have replaced many uses of electric detonators and are safer to handle and store than detonating cord. A version containing an explosive gas mixture has the additional advantage of being entirely inert until the tubing is charged with the gas.

Shock Tube Detonator is available with an optional patented in-line initiator consisting of a threaded adapter and a pre-installed percussion primer providing convenient and reliable initiation.

See also
 Detonating cord – another tubular explosive cord product with much more explosive and direct explosive effects and ability to directly initiate other explosive charges

References

Detonators
Pyrotechnic initiators